Tidehaven Independent School District is a public school district based in the community of Elmaton in unincorporated Matagorda County, Texas (USA).
In addition to Elmaton, the district also serves the communities of Blessing, Markham, and Midfield in western Matagorda County.
Baldomero Gallegos attended Tidehaven schools.

TISD's rival is Palacios Independent School District.

In 2009, the school district was rated "academically acceptable" by the Texas Education Agency.

Schools
Tidehaven Consolidated Junior/Senior High (Grades 6-12) - school was completed in Summer of 2015
Blessing Elementary (Grades PK-5)
Markham Elementary (Grades PK-5)

References

External links
 

School districts in Matagorda County, Texas